Love Unto Waste is a 1986 Hong Kong drama film directed by Stanley Kwan and starring Tony Leung, Irene Wan, Elaine Jin, Tsai Chin, Chow Yun-fat with guest appearances by Elaine Chow and Winnie Yu.

Cast
Tony Leung Chiu-Wai as Tony Cheung, the main protagonist and a rice shop owner
Irene Wan as Billie Yuen, a model
Elaine Jin as Liu Suk-ping, a film actress
Tsai Chin as Chao Su-ling, a lounge singer from Taiwan
Chow Yun-fat as Inspector Lan
Elaine Chow as Ms. Chung, Tony's rice shop staff
Winnie Yu
Yip Koon-chip as Tony's father

Awards and nominations
6th Hong Kong Film Awards
Won: Best Supporting Actress (Elaine Jin)
Won: Best Screenplay (Lai Kit, Yau-tai On-ping)
Nominated: Best Film
Nominated: Best Director (Stanley Kwan)
Nominated: Best Actor (Tony Leung)
Nominated: Best Supporting Actor (Chow Yun-fat)
Nominated: Best Supporting Actress (Tsai Chin)
Nominated: Best Original Film Score (Violet Lam)
Nominated: Best Original Film Song (地下情之 Composer: Violet Lam, Lyricist: Fong Wai-kwong, Performer: Tsai Chin)

See also
Chow Yun-fat filmography

External links

Love Unto Waste at Hong Kong Cinemagic

1986 films
1986 romantic drama films
Hong Kong drama films
1980s mystery films
1980s Cantonese-language films
Films directed by Stanley Kwan
Films set in Hong Kong
Films shot in Hong Kong
1980s Hong Kong films